The Assault on Reason is a 2007 book by Al Gore. In the book, the former U.S. Vice President heavily criticizes the George W. Bush administration for its actions in furthering the "assault on reason".
He argues that there is a trend in U.S. politics toward ignoring facts and analysis when making policy decisions, calling the Congress, the judiciary, and the press complicit in the process. 
Gore's prescription is that the average citizen must be proactive in "restoring democracy". He expresses hopes that the medium of the Internet will supersede television and what he argues is its inherent bias, creating a "marketplace of ideas" that has not been present since the replacement of the printed word with mass media.

The book ranked number one on the New York Times Best Seller list for hardcover nonfiction during the first four weeks of its release, and was on the top-35 list for fifteen weeks. Actor Will Patton narrates the audio version.

Awards
 2007 Quill Awards: History/current events/politics

Notes

External links

 Interview and short book excerpt – NPR

American political books
Books by Al Gore
2007 non-fiction books
Books about George W. Bush
George W. Bush administration controversies